Leslie Vale is a rural residential locality in the local government area (LGA) of Kingborough in the Hobart LGA region of Tasmania. The 2016 census recorded a population of 351 for the state suburb of Leslie Vale.

History 
Leslie Vale was gazetted as a locality in 1970. A Post Office of this name opened in 1946.

Geography
Most of the boundaries are survey lines. The North West Bay River forms part of the southern boundary.

Road infrastructure 
Route A6 (Huon Highway) runs through from north-east to south-west.

References

Towns in Tasmania
Localities of Kingborough Council